Thomas Langan (1929 - May 25, 2012) was an American philosopher and a former president of the Metaphysical Society of America (1982-1983).

References

20th-century American philosophers
Philosophy academics
Presidents of the Metaphysical Society of America
Dickinson College faculty
1929 births
2012 deaths
Heidegger scholars